Pomasia sacculobata is a moth in the family Geometridae. It is found on Peninsular Malaysia and Borneo.

The length of the forewings is 9–10 mm.

References

Moths described in 1997
Eupitheciini